Sir George Berkley  (26 April 1821 – 20 December 1893) was a British civil engineer from London.  He designed the Colesberg Bridge, a 390 m Warren truss bridge built in 1885 over the Orange River in Colesberg, South Africa.

Berkley was a consulting engineer for the Indian Midland Railway and, with Sir Charles Fox, built the 19–mile long Indian Tramway, a light railway running from Arconum to Conjeverum.  He served as president of the Institution of Civil Engineers from May 1891 to May 1892.

Berkley was made a Knight Commander of the Order of St. Michael and St. George in Queen Victoria's 1893 Birthday Honours.  His daughter, Rose, married Sir John St. George, 5th Baronet in 1894.  He died on 20 December 1893.

He was a younger brother of James John Berkley (1819–1862), chief engineer of the Great Indian Peninsula Railway.

References

Bibliography 

        
        
        
        
        
        

1821 births
1893 deaths
Knights Commander of the Order of St Michael and St George
Presidents of the Institution of Civil Engineers
Engineers from London
British railway civil engineers
People from Holloway, London